Joseph Prince McElroy (born August 21, 1930) is an American novelist, short story writer, and essayist. He is noted for his long postmodern novels such as Women and Men.

Personal background 
McElroy was born on August 21, 1930, in Brooklyn, New York, and grew up in Brooklyn Heights. He graduated from Poly Prep Country Day School in 1947 and was given an Alumni Distinguished Achievement Award in 2007 from the school's Board of Governors. He graduated from Williams College in 1951. The following year, McElroy earned a master's degree from Columbia University. He served in the Coast Guard from 1952 to 1954, and then returned to Columbia to complete his Ph.D. in 1961.<ref name="wa">World Authors 1975–1980</ref>

In 1961, McElroy married Joan Leftwich, of London, in London. She is the daughter of Yiddish-speaking Orthodox Jews; her father, Joseph Leftwich, was a translator and anthologizer of Yiddish poetry. The McElroys' only child, Hanna, was born in 1967. McElroy assisted with the birth.

 Career 
McElroy taught English and Creative Writing at the University of New Hampshire from 1956 to 1962 and at Queens College, City University of New York from 1964 to 1995, when he retired. McElroy's first novel, A Smuggler's Bible, was published in 1966. McElroy said A Smuggler's Bible "is like everybody's first novel, trying to put too much between covers. ...[I]t's a young book, and young people still seem to like it."

McElroy's writing is often grouped with that of William Gaddis and Thomas Pynchon, due to the encyclopedic quality of his novels, especially Women and Men (1987). His short fiction was first published in literary journals. Echoes of McElroy's work can be found in that of Don DeLillo and David Foster Wallace. McElroy's work often reflects a preoccupation with how science functions in American society; Exponential, a collection of essays published in Italy in 2003, collects science and technology journalism written primarily in the 1970s and 1980s for the New York Review of Books.

In 1980, McElroy and his class at Queens College interviewed Norman Mailer.Mailer, Norman, Pontifications (1982). He interviewed Harry Mathews in 2002 for the Village Voice. McElroy wrote about his fiction and influences in his essay "Neural Neighborhoods".

 Honors and awards 
 John Simon Guggenheim Memorial Foundation Fellowship, Fiction, 1976
 American Academy of Arts and Letters Award in Literature, 1977
 Rockefeller Foundation Fellowship
 Ingram Merrill Foundation Fellowship, twice
 National Endowment for the Arts Fellowship, twice

 Published works 

 Novels 
 A Smuggler's Bible, Harcourt Brace, 368 pages, 1966. 
 Hind's Kidnap: A Pastoral on Familiar Airs, Harper and Row, 534 pages, 1969. 
 Ancient History: A Paraphase, Knopf, 307 pages, 1971. 
 Lookout Cartridge, Knopf, 531 pages, 1974. 
 Plus, Knopf, 215 pages, 1977. 
 Women and Men, Knopf, 1192 pages, 1987. 
 The Letter Left to Me, Knopf, 151 pages, 1988. 
 Actress in the House, Overlook, 432 pages, 2003. 
 Cannonball, Dzanc Books, 312 pages, 2013. 

 Short stories 
 The Accident, New American Review, Number 2, January 1968.
 Ship Rock: A Place, William B. Ewert, Concord, New Hampshire, limited edition, 42 pages, 1980
 republished as a chapter in Women and Men, 1987
 Preparations for Search 1984
 revised and printed as a chapbook, by Small Anchor Press, 2010
 Night Soul and Other Stories, Dalkey Archive Press, 304 pages, 2011. 
 Taken From Him, Kindle Singles, 2014.
 

 Essays 
 Exponential (2003; published in Italy)
 "Neural Neighborhoods and Other Concrete Abstracts" (1974)

 References 

 Further reading 
 Colby, Vineta (ed). World Authors, 1975–1980 LeClair, Tom. "An Interview with Joseph McElroy", Anything Can Happen, Tom LeClair and Larry McCaffery (eds.), 1983.
 Morrow, Bradford. "An Interview", Conjunctions'' 10 (1987).

Book chapters on McElroy 
.
.
.
 .
, detailed character analysis.

Anthologies of McElroy criticism

External links 
 
 The Literary Encyclopedia
 A Joseph McElroy Festschrift (electronic book review)
 Joseph McElroy resources on the Web
 "The Courage of Joseph McElroy" (essay)
 Radio interviews with Michael Silverblatt for Bookworm
 Conversation with author Joshua Cohen for a Triple Canopy podcast
 "Neural Neighborhoods"

1930 births
Living people
Postmodern writers
American science fiction writers
20th-century American novelists
21st-century American novelists
20th-century American male writers
21st-century American male writers
Novelists from New York (state)
American male novelists
Writers from Brooklyn
Williams College alumni
Columbia University alumni
Poly Prep alumni
University of New Hampshire faculty
Queens College, City University of New York faculty
National Endowment for the Arts Fellows
Rockefeller Fellows
United States Coast Guard enlisted
People from Brooklyn Heights